The 2013–14 Swiss Super League, was the 117th season of top-tier football in Switzerland. It began on 13 July 2013 and ended on 18 May 2014. Basel successfully defended their title for a record fifth time in a row.

A total of 10 teams competed in the league. The 9 best teams from the 2012–13 season and the 2012–13 Swiss Challenge League champion FC Aarau.

Teams

Stadia and locations

Personnel and kits

League table

Results

First and Second Round

Third and Fourth Round

Season statistics

Top scorers

Source:

Awards

Annual awards

References

External links
 
 

 

Swiss Super League
1
Swiss Super League seasons